The KUCHMA Electoral Bloc of Political Parties, is a political alliance in Ukraine.

KUCHMA, the name of former president Leonid Kuchma, is a backronym that stands for "Конституція – Україна – Честь – Мир – Антифашизм", which is translated as Constitution – Ukraine – Honour – Peace – Antifascism.

The bloc had been organized for participation in the 2007 parliamentary election by Oleksandr Volkov, a businessman and former chief of staff to former president Leonid Kuchma. At that elections the bloc failed to enter the parliament winning only 0,10% of the national vote.

The Bloc consisted of:

 Party "Union"
 All-Ukrainian Union "Center"

References

Leonid Kuchma
Defunct political party alliances in Ukraine
Russian political parties in Ukraine